Dendronotus is a genus of sea slugs, nudibranchs, marine gastropod molluscs in the superfamily Tritonioidea.

This genus is within the clade Cladobranchia (according to the taxonomy of the Gastropoda by Bouchet & Rocroi, 2005).

Description
Dendronotus has an elongated, broad body, with 4 to 8 pairs of branched cerata on the notum. Animals in this genus have an obvious oral veil with 2 to 5 extensions. These extensions may be branched. Smaller unbranched extensions are found around the mouth.  The rhinophores are surrounded by a sheath and the sheath itself has branched extensions. A large extension is found on the side at the base of each rhinophore. The anal opening occurs between the first and second set of dorsal cerata on the right side of the body.

Diet 
This genus feeds on hydroids, as reflected by its serrated radula.

Species
Species within the genus Dendronotus include:
Dendronotus albopunctatus Robilliard, 1972
Dendronotus albus MacFarland, 1966 (synonym: Dendronotus diversicolor Robilliard, 1972)
Dendronotus arcticus Korshunova, Sanamyan, Zimina, Fletcher & Martynov, 2016
Dendronotus bathyvela Martynov, Fujiwara, Tsuchida, R. Nakano, N. Sanamyan, K. Sanamyan, Fletcher & Korshunova, 2020
Dendronotus claguei Valdés, Lundsten & N. G. Wilson, 2018
Dendronotus comteti Valdés & Bouchet, 1998
Dendronotus dalli Bergh, 1879
Dendronotus elegans A. E. Verrill, 1880
Dendronotus europaeus Korshunova, Martynov, Bakken & Picton, 2017
Dendronotus frondosus (Ascanius, 1774) (synonyms: D. arborescens, D. reynoldsi)
Dendronotus gracilis Baba, 1949
Dendronotus iris J.G. Cooper, 1863 (synonym D. giganteus)
Dendronotus jamsteci Martynov, Fujiwara, Tsuchida, R. Nakano, N. Sanamyan, K. Sanamyan, Fletcher & Korshunova, 2020
Dendronotus kalikal Ekimova, Korshunova, Schepetov, Neretina, Sanamyan & Martynov, 2015
Dendronotus kamchaticus Ekimova, Korshunova, Schepetov, Neretina, Sanamyan & Martynov, 2015
Dendronotus lacteus (W. Thompson, 1840)
Dendronotus nordenskioeldi Korshunova, Bakken, Grøtan, Johnson, Lundin & Martynov, 2020
Dendronotus patricki Stout, N. G. Wilson & Valdés, 2011
Dendronotus primorjensis Martynov, Sanamyan & Korshunova, 2015
Dendronotus robilliardi Korshunova, Sanamyan, Zimina, Fletcher & Martynov, 2016
Dendronotus robustus Verrill, 1870
Dendronotus rufus O'Donoghue, 1921
Dendronotus subramosus MacFarland, 1966
Dendronotus velifer G. O. Sars, 1878
Dendronotus venustus MacFarland, 1966
Dendronotus yrjargul Korshunova, Bakken, Grøtan, Johnson, Lundin & Martynov, 2020
Dendronotus zakuro Martynov, Fujiwara, Tsuchida, R. Nakano, N. Sanamyan, K. Sanamyan, Fletcher & Korshunova, 2020
Species brought into synonymy
 Dendronotus diversicolor Robilliard, 1972: synonym of Dendronotus albus MacFarland, 1966
 Dendronotus luteolus Lafont, 1871: synonym of Dendronotus frondosus (Ascanius, 1774)
 Dendronotus nanus Marcus & Marcus, 1967: synonym of Dendronotus iris J. G. Cooper, 1863
 Dendronotus stellifer A. Adams & Reeve [in A. Adams], 1848: synonym of Bornella stellifer (A. Adams & Reeve [in A. Adams], 1848)
 Dendronotus tenellus A. Adams & Reeve [in A. Adams], 1848: synonym of Bornella stellifer (A. Adams & Reeve [in A. Adams], 1848)

References

External links
 

Dendronotidae